Lee Remick (1935–1991) was an American film and television actress.

Lee Remick may also refer to:

"Lee Remick" (The Go-Betweens song), 1978
"Lee Remick" (Hefner song), 1998